Arthur (Arthur South) Aerodrome  is located  southeast of Arthur, Ontario, Canada.

See also
List of airports in the Arthur area

References

Registered aerodromes in Wellington County, Ontario